Ivan Ljubičić was the defending champion, but lost in the quarterfinals to Andreas Seppi.

Novak Djokovic won in the final 6–4, 6–0, against Stanislas Wawrinka.

Seeds

Draw

Finals

Top half

Bottom half

External links
Draw
Qualifying draw

Singles